Inferior ganglion may refer to:

 Inferior cervical ganglion
 Inferior cervical sympathetic ganglion
 Inferior ganglion of vagus nerve
 Inferior ganglion of glossopharyngeal nerve
 Inferior mesenteric ganglion